Martin Wen-Yu Lo is a spacecraft trajectory expert currently working at the NASA-owned Jet Propulsion Laboratory. Martin Lo is well known for discovering the Interplanetary Superhighway, also known as the Interplanetary Transport Network. The superhighway is created by combined gravitational forces of several planets that connects planets by a network of “tunnels” and is the most efficient way to navigate the solar system. This continues to be his main area of research.

Biography 
Lo received his Bachelor of Science in 1975 from the California Institute of Technology in mathematics and his PhD, also in mathematics, in 1981 from Cornell University.

He has been a research scientist in the Navigation and Mission Design Section at the JPL since 1986.

In 2000, Lo, Kathleen Howell, and other scientists from the JPL developed the LTool program to calculate paths near Lagrange points (ITN paths). Compared with previous methods, LTool is capable of predicting orbits up to 50 times faster. They used this tool to calculate the trajectory for the Genesis mission (2001, NASA) trajectory, which took days rather than 8 weeks. The trajectory makes use of gravitational tugs of objects in the way of the spacecraft, ensuring minimal fuel use on the return journey. They called this trajectory the Interplanetary Superhighway. He also designed the trajectory for SpaceDev's SmallTug. LTool was nominated for the Discover Innovation Award. He is the leader of the Lagrange Group, which is an interdisciplinary and international group of researchers and STEM experts from universities, NASA centers, and industry. Their focus is on developing nonlinear astrodynamics techniques with applications to space missions and dynamical astronomy.

Lo appeared in Werner Herzog's film The Wild Blue Yonder in 2005.

Awards and recognition
Martin was awarded the NOGLSTP LGBTQ Scientist of the Year in 2012.

Nominated for a Discover Innovation Award by Discover magazine for work on the Interplanetary Superhighway.

References

External links 
 
 

20th-century American mathematicians
21st-century American mathematicians
American LGBT scientists
Living people
California Institute of Technology alumni
Cornell University alumni
Year of birth missing (living people)